Alex Fontana (born 5 August 1992 in Lugano) is a Swiss racing driver of Greek descent, currently racing as a professional driver in the GT4 European Series for Centri Porsche Ticino. He is a freelance driver with an open contract able to race for different teams and different manufacturers at the same time. When he is not racing, he works as a coach and driving instructor in Europe, America, and China, while commentating the Formula 1 Grands Prix for Swiss television with RSI.

Career

Karting

Fontana's passion for racing began in 1996 at three and a half years old in the Greek island of Rhodes, driving his first baby Puffo Kart. Until 2008 he raced in the Swiss National Championships and international events as a factory driver for Swiss Hutless and PCR International. Highlights include the Swiss Karting Championship 2007 KF3 title, the 2006 Biland 4 Stroke World Final win in Dubai, the Bridgestone Cup 2008 KF2 title win, and the Italian Open Master 2008 Runner Up, as well as qualifying for the World Karting Championship 2008 in La Conca, Italy.

Single seaters

In 2009 came the switch to single-seaters after making it into the BMW Talent Scout event at Valencia in 2008. In 2009 he raced in Formula Azzurra with MG Motorsport taking two wins and one additional podium.
In 2010 there was the switch to Formula 3 with Corbetta Competizioni in the Italian Championship, before moving up in 2011 with the same team in the European Formula 3 Open. 2011 was a successful year for Fontana with two wins and nine podiums, allowing him to take the overall championship title. At the end of the year, he had the opportunity to test the Mercedes DTM for the HWA Team.

In August 2011, Fontana made his debut in the Formula One–supporting GP3 Series, replacing Vittorio Ghirelli at Jenzer Motorsport for the penultimate round of the season at Spa–Francorchamps. After finishing 14th in the first race, he took the final championship point in race two by finishing in sixth place.

In 2012 he joined the FIA Formula 2 Championship with three podiums and a win, being selected at the end of the year by Lotus F1 Junior Team, thanks also to other points finish in GP3 Series in 4th place, again as a wild card entry and again with Jenzer Motorsport.

2013 was the first season with Lotus F1 Junior Team and the first full season with Jenzer Motorsport in the GP3 Series, with one podium finish and the highlight of the first Formula 1 test with Lotus F1 Team 30 September in Paul Ricard circuit.

In 2014 he continued with Lotus F1 Junior Team in GP3 Series but switching to ART Grand Prix, with two podiums and two front rows start. With only 5 races in the points out of 18, he finished 11th in the championship. At the end of the year, he joined the World Series 3.5 by Renault's official test in Jerez with Lotus Charouz signing the 2nd best lap time.

2015 was a bit of a special year. Lotus was sold to Renault and this caused the exit from the Junior Program. He raced again in GP3 Series with Status GP, with the Canadian team having some difficulties throughout the year and eventually exit the series. In the same year came the call from Pons Racing to replace Roberto Mehri in Monte Carlo, where he raced with Marussia F1. The first race in World Series 3.5 by Renault, the first race in the streets of Monaco, finished in the points with 9th place. At the end of the year he was called by Jarno Trulli to compete in the FIA Formula E Championship last double-round of London Battersea Park, and with the best result in 9th place in the second qualifying. After that, the last single-seater experience to date was the official GP2 Series test in Abu Dhabi, with Status GP and Rapax Team, with the highest result of 8th in the standings.

GT and touring cars

In 2016 there was the switch to GT cars joining McLaren GT Academy for a Blancpain GT Endurance campaign and 24 Hours of Spa in PRO class. At the end of the year, it was called by KIA Motors to develop the new Super Production car for China Touring Car Championship, collecting a podium and a pole position in the debut weekends.

2017 was again in Blancpain GT Endurance and 24 Hours of Spa but in PRO-AM, with the Mercedes AMG supported car of AKKA ASP and his Chupa-Chups livery. A highlight of the year is the overall best lap time in the two days of official testing in Paul Ricard on a field of 55 cars. He was signed by KIA Motors for the maximum number of rounds a foreign driver could complete, four, taking two pole positions, two wins, and one more podium.

In 2018 he raced for Emil Frey Jaguar Racing winning the Blancpain GT Series Endurance Cup - Silver Cup and also placing the car in the top 5 in the overall standings 2 times out of 5. In China, he has been confirmed for the third year by KIA Motors in China Touring Car Championship. As a foreign driver he disputed the 4 mandatory races on 8 where, thanks to two victories, he allowed Kia to win the constructors' championship. He also took part in two VLN races to achieve the Permit A for the Nordschleife.

2019 was opened by taking part in the first round of the VLN with the official Nissan KCMG team at the "65. ADAC Westfalenfahrt". In this year Fontana was chosen as a driver for the official AMG team - Phantom Pro Racing in the China GT Championship, GT4 class, where, after an intense championship, he managed to win the title.
He also raced for the fourth year in a row as an official Kia motors driver for Dongfeng Yueda Kia Racing Team in the China touring car championship for the maximum number of races allowed for a foreign driver.
Thanks to his 84 points the Dongfeng Yueda Kia Racing Team has won the manufacturers' title for the second year in a row.
Lastly, he has been involved in other motorsports competitions during the year including the china endurance championship as a driver for Lamborghini in GT3 class and as a coach for Volkswagen in TCR class.
2019 has also shown Fontana engaged in collaborations with the Swiss television RSI for the events of Formula 1 and other motorsport shows.
In recognition for this year, Fontana was awarded by the Swiss Automobile Club an award for sports merit and a trophy in memory of Loris Kessel.

In 2020 Fontana was meant to join three different competitions in Asia, as well as a comeback in the European competitions. - Due to the COVID-19 pandemic, many competitions have been canceled and Fontana didn't take part in any of the competitions in Asia. -

Fontana was confirmed to race with Adderly Fong in the Silver-Pro class of the GT World Challenge Asia behind the wheel of a Mercedes-AMG GT3 of the Zun Motorsport Crew.
He, also, was still in contract to continue to race in the China GT Championship, that year in two classes: in a Mercedes-AMG GT3 in the GT3 class with Chris Chia and the Phantom Pro Racing Team, and, after the success of 2019, in the Mercedes-AMG GT4 in GT4 class.
 
Furthermore, after a long stop of the activities, Fontana has been called to compete in the GT World Challenge Europe Endurance Cup 2020, driving the new Mercedes-AMG GT3 EVO of the AKKA ASP Team. The year has been concluded with 11th place in the endurance cup.

In 2021, Fontana competed again in Europe behind the wheel of the consolidated Emil Frey's Lamborghini Huracán GT3 Evo. This comeback was announced three years after his success in the Endurance Silver Cup with the Swiss Team. Fontana won the 2021 championship title in the Endurance Silver Cup, with his teammates Rolf Ineichen and Ricardo Feller, and he was the sole champion of the Sprint Silver Cup. At the end of the season, he was the unique winner of the combined Silver Championship title, with a gap of 28 points on the 2nd placed, his teammate Ricardo Feller. 
Even if he was racing in the Silver category, Fontana also finished the year in 5th place overall among Pro drivers in the Sprint Championship. In addition, the endurance team was the protagonist of a record in this competition during the debut race in Monza, managing to become the first Silver cup team to finish the race on the overall podium, other than winning in their category.

In June 2021, Fontana had taken part in his first 24 hours of Nürburgring, racing in the main class with the Konrad Motorsport's Lamborghini Huracán GT3 Evo.

Fontana returned to GT World Challenge Europe in 2023 after a year away, competing for his 2022 GT4 European Series employers Centri Porsche Ticino alongside Ivan Jacoma and Nicolas Leutwiler.

Racing record

Career summary

* Season still in progress.

** Season suspended due to COVID-19 situation.

Complete GP3 Series results
(key) (Races in bold indicate pole position) (Races in italics indicate fastest lap)

‡ Half points awarded as less than 75% of race distance was completed.

Complete FIA Formula Two Championship results
(key) (Races in bold indicate pole position) (Races in italics indicate fastest lap)

Complete Formula Renault 3.5 Series results
(key) (Races in bold indicate pole position; races in italics indicate fastest lap)

Complete Formula E results
(key) (Races in bold indicate pole position; races in italics indicate fastest lap)

Complete European Le Mans Series results

Complete China Touring Car Championship results

Complete China GT Championship GT3/GT4 results

* Half points awarded due to red flag.

** Season suspended due to COVID-19 situation.

Complete GT World Challenge Asia results

* Season suspended due to COVID-19 situation.

Complete GT World Challenge Europe - Sprint Cup results

Complete GT World Challenge Europe - Endurance Cup results

Complete Nurburgring 24 Hour results

Complete GT4 European Series

References

External links

1992 births
Living people
Sportspeople from Lugano
Swiss people of Greek descent
Swiss racing drivers
Euroformula Open Championship drivers
Italian Formula Three Championship drivers
Formula Azzurra drivers
FIA Formula Two Championship drivers
Swiss GP3 Series drivers
Formula E drivers
ART Grand Prix drivers
World Series Formula V8 3.5 drivers
Blancpain Endurance Series drivers
European Le Mans Series drivers
Jenzer Motorsport drivers
Status Grand Prix drivers
Pons Racing drivers
Emil Frey Racing drivers
International GT Open drivers
Mercedes-AMG Motorsport drivers
Super Nova Racing drivers
Nürburgring 24 Hours drivers
McLaren Racing drivers
Lamborghini Squadra Corse drivers
GT4 European Series drivers